Ilemodes astriga is a moth of the family Erebidae first described by George Hampson in 1916. It is found in Ethiopia, Kenya, Malawi, Mozambique, South Africa, Uganda, Zambia and Zimbabwe.

References

Arctiini
Moths described in 1916
Erebid moths of Africa